Galatasaray SK. Women's Volleyball 2011–2012 season is the 2011–2012 volleyball season for Turkish professional volleyball club Galatasaray.

The club competes in:
Turkish Women's Volleyball League
Turkish Cup

Team Roster Season 2011–12

Squad changes for the 2011–2012 season

In:

Out:

Results, schedules and standings

Pre-season games
Galatasaray MP won the Izida Cup.

Izida Cup

Results

Turkish Volleyball League 2011–12

Regular season

Turkish Cup 2011–12

CEV Cup 2011–12

References

Galatasaray S.K. (women's volleyball) seasons
Galatasaray Sports Club 2011–12 season